Eleftherio-Kordelio  (Elefthério-Kordelió) is a suburb of the Thessaloniki Urban Area and was a former municipality of the regional unit of Thessaloniki, Greece. Since the 2011 local government reform it is part of the municipality Kordelio-Evosmos, of which it is a municipal unit. It gained its present form in 1982, after the union of the then municipalities of Eleftheria and Neo Kordelio. They were formed in 1924 by Greek refugees from the town of Kordelio on the west coast of Asia Minor. In the Ottoman Empire the region and the small village that stood in the same area was known as Harman koy.

Eleftherio-Kordelio covers an area of 3.431 km² with 27,067 inhabitants in 2011. In this region is located the Railway Museum of Thessaloniki.

External links
Official Website of the Municipality

References

Populated places in Thessaloniki (regional unit)